The 30th (Northumbrian) Anti-Aircraft Brigade was an air defence formation of Britain's Territorial Army from 1936 until 1955, which defended Tyneside and Sunderland during the Second World War.

Origins
The formation was raised as 30th (Northumbrian) Anti-Aircraft Group on 1 November 1936  at Sunderland forming part of 2nd Anti-Aircraft Division. Its initial order of battle was as follows:
 62nd (North and East Riding) Anti-Aircraft Brigade, Royal Artillery (RA) – Heavy Anti-Aircraft (HAA) unit formed in 1936 by conversion of 73rd (Northumbrian) Field Brigade, RA
 HQ at Kingston upon Hull
 172nd (1st East Riding) AA Battery
 173rd (2nd East Riding) AA Battery
 174th (1st North Riding) AA Battery
 175th (2nd North Riding) AA Battery
 63rd (Northumbrian) Anti-Aircraft Brigade RA –  HAA unit formed in 1936 by conversion of 55th (Northumbrian) Medium Brigade, RA
 HQ at Sunderland
 176th (Durham) AA Battery
 177th (Durham) AA Battery
 178th (Durham) AA Battery
 64th (Northumbrian) Anti-Aircraft Brigade RA – HAA unit formed in 1936 by conversion of batteries originally from Tynemouth Heavy Brigade RA
 HQ at North Shields
 179th (Tynemouth) AA Battery converted from 150 Heavy Battery
 180th (Tynemouth) AA Battery converted from 152 Heavy Battery
 268th (Durham) AA Battery raised 1939
 37th (Tyne) Anti-Aircraft Battalion (Tyne Electrical Engineers), Royal Engineers (RE) – Searchlight unit formed in 1936 by expansion of 307 (Tyne) AA S/L Coy RE (Tyne Electrical Engineers)
 HQ at Tynemouth
 307th, 308th, 348th, 349th AA Companies
 47th (The Durham Light Infantry) Anti-Aircraft Battalion, RE – Searchlight unit formed in 1936 by conversion of 7th Battalion Durham Light Infantry
 HQ at Sunderland
 386th, 387th, 388th, 389th AA Companies

In 1938 the RA replaced its traditional unit designation 'Brigade' by the modern 'Regiment', which allowed the 'AA Groups' to take the more usual formation title of 'Brigades'. Brig F.C. Chaytor, OBE, MC, was appointed brigade commander on 1 November 1938. Anti-Aircraft Command was formed in April 1939 to control all the TA's AA units and formations. 30th AA Brigade transferred to the new 7th AA Division  when that was formed in Newcastle upon Tyne in June 1939. As AA Command continued to expand, 62nd AA Regiment and 47th Searchlight Battalion moved to other brigades in 7 AA Division and were replaced by newly formed units.

Second World War

Mobilisation
On the outbreak of war 30th AA Brigade was mobilised to defend its home area of Tyneside and Sunderland, with the following order of battle:
 63rd (Northumbrian) Anti-Aircraft Regiment, Royal Artillery – as above
 64th (Northumbrian) Anti-Aircraft Regiment, Royal Artillery – as above
 87th Anti-Aircraft Regiment, Royal Artillery – HAA unit formed at Hebburn May 1939
 37th (Tyne Electrical Engineers) AA Battalion RE – as above
 5th Battalion, Royal Northumberland Fusiliers (53rd Searchlight Regiment) – searchlight unit formed at Walker-on-Tyne in 1938 by conversion of  infantry battalion

Early in 1940, 37th (TEE) AA Bn left to join the British Expeditionary Force in France. It was one of the last units to be evacuated, from Saint-Nazaire two weeks after the main Dunkirk evacuation.

In 1940, RA regiments equipped with 3-inch, 3.7-inch or 4.5-inch AA guns were designated Heavy Anti-Aircraft (HAA) to distinguish them from the new Light Anti-Aircraft (LAA) regiments, and RE AA battalions were transferred to the RA and designated Searchlight regiments.

The Blitz

Order of Battle 1940–41
During The Blitz, 30th Anti-Aircraft Brigade comprised both HAA and LAA artillery while the searchlight units in the area were controlled by 57th Anti-Aircraft Brigade:
 63rd (Northumbrian) HAA Regt – as above
 176, 177, 178, 269 HAA Btys
 64th (Northumbrian) HAA Regt – as above
 179, 180, 268 HAA Btys
 431 Bty (joined Summer 1941)
 37th (Tyne Electrical Engineers) LAA Regt – duplicate of 37 AA Battalion RE (see above), organised on 28 August 1939 as an LAA Regiment RA; left July 1941
 123, 127, 222 LAA Btys
  38th LAA Rgt (part) – new unit raised on 28 August 1939 in North Yorkshire; shared with 10th AA Division
 68th LAA Regt – new unit formed December 1940, joined by February 1941
 203, 204, 205 LAA Btys
 7th AA Z Rgt – new unit raised in September 1940, equipped with Z Battery rocket launchers
 106, 109, 110, 117 Z Btys

Mid-war
As the war progressed, many experienced prewar AA units were deployed overseas and replaced in Home Forces by newer units, often 'mixed' units including personnel from the Auxiliary Territorial Service or members of the Home Guard. 37 LAA Regt went first to Palestine in April 1942 and then moved on to North Africa; 63 HAA Regt went to Ceylon in May 1942; 38 LAA Regt went to North Africa in August 1942  and 64 HAA Regt to Tunisia in May 1943. 68 LAA Regiment joined 59th (Staffordshire) Infantry Division in April 1943 and served with it during the Normandy Campaign.

Order of Battle 1941–42
During this period the brigade was composed as follows:

 63rd (Northumbrian) HAA Rgt – left for War Office (WO) Control December 1941 preparatory to  embarking for Ceylon
 64th (Northumbrian) HAA Rgt – left April 1942 preparatory to joining Operation Torch
 135th (Mixed) HAA Rgt – new unit raised in October 1941
 466, 467, 473 (M) HAA Btys
 136th HAA Rgt – joined from 2nd AA Division April 1942; returned to 2nd AA Division June 1942
 182, 198, 409, 432 HAA Btys
 146th HAA Rgt – new unit raised in January 1942; left May 1942
 176, 339, 414, 465 HAA Btys
 153rd (Mixed) HAA Rgt – new unit raised in March 1942
 509, 521 (M) HAA Btys
 37th (TEE) LAA Rgt – left for Middle East Forces June 1941
 50th LAA Rgt – left for 6th AA Division February 1942
 58, 93, 245 LAA Btys
 68th LAA Rgt – to 43 AA Bde by May 1942
 203, 204, 278 LAA Btys
 124th (Highland) LAA Rgt – converted from 51st S/L Rgt and joined May 1942
 404, 411, 412, 413 LAA Btys
 7th AA Z Rgt – to 43 AA Bde February 1942
 30 AA Brigade Signal Office Mixed Sub-Section (part of No 1 Company, 7 AA Division Mixed Signal Unit, Royal Corps of Signals)

Reorganisation
On 30 September 1942 the AA Divisions and Corps were dissolved and 30th Anti-Aircraft Brigade came under a new  6 AA Group covering Scotland and North East England and aligned with No. 13 Group RAF.

Order of Battle 1942–44
Under the new command structure, 30 AA Bde had the following composition:
 122nd HAA Rgt – from Orkney and Shetland Defences (OSDEF) February 1944
 397, 400, 401, 455 HAA Btys
 130th (M) HAA Rgt – from 42 AA Bde Summer 1943
 442, 443, 448, 449 (M) HAA Btys
 135th (M) HAA Rgt – left Summer 1943 
 466, 467, 473, 494 HAA Btys
 547 HAA Bty – joined November 1942
 149th (M) HAA Rgt – from 4 AA Group Summer 1943
 506, 507, 512, 581 (M) HAA Btys
 153rd (M) HAA Rgt
 509, 521 (M) HAA Btys
 513, 544 (M) HAA Btys – joined December 1942
 170th (M) HAA Rgt – from 42 AA Bde April 1943; left Summer 1943
 528, 554 567, 568 (M) HAA Btys
 124th LAA Rgt – to 2 AA Group by March 1943
 53rd (Royal Northumberland Fusiliers)  S/L Rgt
 408, 409, 410, 565 S/L Btys
 21st (M) AA 'Z' Rgt  – new unit formed December 1942, joined April 1943
 109, 110, 213 (M) Z Btys

Later war
In March 1944, 30 AA Bde HQ was transferred to 2 AA Group in South East England. Here it had just two units under its command:
 183rd (Mixed) HAA Rgt
 564, 591, 608, 640 (M) HAA Btys
 143rd LAA Rgt
 403, 410, 413 LAA Btys

Order of Battle 1944–45
However, in April 1944 the brigade's reporting line changed again and it became part of 5 AA Group covering the East Coast and East Midlands. A number of its former units returned to its command, and over succeeding months it exchanged units with other brigades in 2 and 5 AA Groups.
 122nd HAA Rgt – to 3 AA Group May 1944
 397, 400, 401 HAA Btys
 129th (Mixed) HAA Rgt – from 43 AA Bde July, returned August 1944
 444, 445, 454, 455  (M) HAA Btys
 130th (M) HAA Rgt – to 43 AA Bde September 1944
 442, 443, 448, 449 (M) HAA Btys
 149th (M) HAA Rgt
 506, 507, 512 (M) HAA Btys
 151st (Mixed) HAA Rgt – from 41 AA Bde August 1944
 510, 511, 514, 516  (M) HAA Btys
 158th (Mixed) HAA Rgt
 540, 541, 572  (M) HAA Btys
 548 (M) HAA Bty – disbanded December 1944
 183rd (Mixed) HAA Rgt – from 71 AA Bde November 1944
 564, 591, 608, 640 (M) HAA Btys
 187th (Mixed) HAA Rgt – from 57 AA Bde October 1944
 626, 644, 645  (M) HAA Btys
 128th LAA Rgt – from 3 AA Group November 1944
 421, 422, 423 LAA Btys
 7 AA Area Mixed Rgt – from 43 AA Bde July 1944
 106, 117, 228, 229 (M) Z Btys
 21 AA Area Mixed Rgt
 109, 110, 213 (M) Z Btys

By October 1944, the brigade's HQ establishment was 9 officers, 8 male other ranks and 25 members of the ATS, together with a small number of attached drivers, cooks and mess orderlies (male and female). In addition, the brigade had a Mixed Signal Office Section of 1 officer, 5 male other ranks and 19 ATS, which was formally part of the Group signal unit.

War's end
By the end of 1944, 21st Army Group was suffering a severe manpower shortage, particularly among the infantry, and AA Command was forced to disband several regiments and batteries, and release their personnel. At the same time the German Luftwaffe was suffering from such shortages of pilots, aircraft and fuel that serious air attacks on the United Kingdom could be discounted, so the War Office began to convert surplus AA regiments into infantry battalions, primarily for line of communication and occupation duties in North West Europe, thereby releasing trained infantry for frontline service. Being stationed in Eastern England, still threatened by V-1 flying bombs air-launched from the North Sea, 30 AA Brigade was less affected by these changes. Nevertheless, in January 1945, 128th LAA Rgt was converted into 628th Infantry Rgt, RA, and went to Europe, while 183rd (M) HAA Rgt was sent to Antwerp to defend that city against bombardment by V-1s.

Order of Battle 1945
From mid-February 1945 until the end of the war, 30 AA Bde had the following composition:
 130th (M) HAA Rgt – returned June 1945
 144th (M) HAA Rgt – joined June 1945
 497, 498, 503 (M) HAA Btys
 504 (M) HAA Bty – disbanded July 1945
 151 (M) HAA Rgt
 158 (M) HAA Rgt
 147th (Glasgow) LAA Rgt – detached to 41 AA Bde for agricultural work summer 1945
 492, 493, 495 LAA Btys
 7 AA Area Mixed Rgt – disbanded April 1945
 21 AA Area Mixed Rgt – disbanded April 1945
 10 AA Area Maintenance HQ – joined May 1945

Postwar
When the TA was reformed in 1947, 30th Anti-Aircraft Brigade's Regular Army units reformed 8 AA Bde at Newcastle, while the TA portion was renumbered a 56th (Northumbrian) Anti-Aircraft Brigade, with its HQ at Washington, Co Durham, and the following order of battle:
 325 (Sunderland) LAA Rgt at Sunderland – formerly 125 (Northumbrian) Anti-Tank Regt
 463 (Durham) HAA Rgt at Sunderland – formerly 63 (Northumbrian) HAA Regt (above)'''444–473 Regts at British Army units 1945 on.
485 (Tees) HAA Rgt at Middlesbrough – formerly 85 (Tees) HAA Regt 589 (Durham Light Infantry) S/L Rgt  at Stockton-on-Tees – formerly 54th (Durham Light Infantry) S/L Rgt564–591 Regts at British Army units 1945 on. 
 590 (Durham Light Infantry) LAA/SL Rgt at Stockton – formerly 113th (Durham Light Infantry) LAA Rgt 654 LAA Regt at Bishop Auckland – newly raisedThe brigade was part of 3rd Anti-Aircraft Group with its headquarters in Edinburgh.

654 LAA Regt was placed in suspended animation in May 1949, and 325 LAA Regt merged into another unit in January 1954. Then on 1 March 1954, 56th (Northumbrian) Anti-Aircraft Brigade HQ was disbanded at Seaburn, Sunderland. 

In 1955 AA Command was disbanded and the air defence of the UK was reorganised. A new 30th Anti-Aircraft Brigade was formed as a TA HQ from the Regular Army's 1st Anti-Aircraft Brigade, based at Edenbridge, Kent, with no connection with Northumbria. It included 258th (Sussex Yeomanry) Light Anti-Aircraft Regiment, Royal Artillery and 265th, 431st Light Anti-Aircraft Regiment, Royal Artillery, 458th (Kent) Light Anti-Aircraft Regiment RA, 565th & 570th LAA Regiments. It remained unchanged until several amalgamations and re-rolings in May 1961. The brigade disbanded on 1 May 1961.

Footnotes

Notes

References
 Basil Collier, History of the Second World War, United Kingdom Military Series: The Defence of the United Kingdom, London: HM Stationery Office, 1957.
 Major L.F. Ellis, History of the Second World War, United Kingdom Military Series: Victory in the West, Vol II: The Defeat of Germany, London: HM Stationery Office, 1968/Uckfield: Naval & Military, 2004, .
 Gen Sir Martin Farndale, History of the Royal Regiment of Artillery: The Years of Defeat: Europe and North Africa, 1939–1941, Woolwich: Royal Artillery Institution, 1988/London: Brasseys, 1996, .
 J.B.M. Frederick, Lineage Book of British Land Forces 1660–1978, Vol II, Wakefield, Microform Academic, 1984, .
 
 
 Norman E.H. Litchfield, The Territorial Artillery 1908–1988 (Their Lineage, Uniforms and Badges), Nottingham: Sherwood Press, 1992, .
 Robert Palmer, 'AA Command History and Personnel' at British Military History.
 Sir Frederick Pile's despatch: "The Anti-Aircraft Defence of the United Kingdom from 28th July, 1939, to 15th April, 1945" London Gazette 18 December 1947.
 Brig N.W. Routledge, History of the Royal Regiment of Artillery: Anti-Aircraft Artillery 1914–55'', London: Royal Artillery Institution/Brassey's, 1994, .

External sources
 British Military History
 British Army units from 1945 on
 Orbat.com 
 Orders of Battle at Patriot Files
 The Royal Artillery 1939–45

Military units and formations established in 1936
Air defence brigades of the British Army
Anti-Aircraft brigades of the British Army in World War II
Military units and formations in Northumberland
Military units and formations in County Durham
Military units and formations in Sunderland
Military units and formations disestablished in 1954